William "Willie" Whiteley (31 May 1870 – 28 October 1938), also known by the nickname of "Bobby", was an English rugby union footballer who played in the 1890s. He played at representative level for England, and at club level for Bramley, as a  forward, e.g. front row, lock, or back row. Prior to Tuesday 2 June 1896, Bramley was a rugby union club.

Background
Bobby Whiteley was born in Bury, Lancashire, England, and he died aged 68 in Dearnley, Littleborough, Lancashire, England.

Playing career

International honours
Bobby Whiteley won a cap for England while at Bramley in the 1896 Home Nations Championship against Wales at Rectory Field, Blackheath, London.

Change of Code
When Bramley converted from the rugby union code to the rugby league code on Tuesday 2 June 1896, Bobby Whiteley would have been approximately 25 years of age. Consequently, he may have been both a rugby union and rugby league footballer for Bramley.

References

External links
Search for "Whiteley" at rugbyleagueproject.org
Search for "Bobby Whiteley" at britishnewspaperarchive.co.uk
Search for "William Whiteley" at britishnewspaperarchive.co.uk
Search for "Willie Whiteley" at britishnewspaperarchive.co.uk

1871 births
1938 deaths
Bramley RLFC players
England international rugby union players
English rugby union players
Place of death missing
Rugby league players from Bury, Greater Manchester
Rugby union forwards